111th Brigade may refer to:
 111th Indian Infantry Brigade
 111th Infantry Brigade (Pakistan)
 
 111th Brigade (United Kingdom)
 111th Military Intelligence Brigade (United States)
 111th Sustainment Brigade (United States)